The Meeting is a 1987 American play by Jeff Stetson about an imaginary meeting between Martin Luther King Jr. and Malcolm X in 1965 in a hotel in Harlem during the height of the Civil Rights Movement. The play was later televised on American Playhouse in 1989.

Reception
The Meeting won a Louis B. Mayer Award and eight 1987 NAACP Theatre Awards.  It has been performed throughout Europe and the United States.

Actual meeting
In reality, the two men only met once, while both were in Washington, D.C. to watch the Senate debates regarding the (eventual) passing of the Civil Rights Act of 1964. On March 26, 1964, they briefly spoke with each other as they walked through the United States Senate together for about a minute.

See also
Civil rights movement in popular culture
Two-hander

References

External links
Dramatists.com

American plays
1987 plays
Cultural depictions of Malcolm X
Cultural depictions of Martin Luther King Jr.
Plays set in New York City
Plays about race and ethnicity
Civil rights movement in popular culture
Two-handers
English-language plays